Hazel Webb-Crozier is a costume designer from Belfast, Northern Ireland.

Since 1990, she has been involved with costume design for the British and Irish film and television industries and in 2005 won her first IFTA for her work on Mickybo and Me, a film telling the story of two local Northern Irish children, one Catholic and one Protestant, who become friends at the start of the troubles in 1970.

More recently, Webb-Crozier has managed the costume and wardrobe department on high-profile Hollywood films such as Your Highness (currently in post-production), Closing the Ring, Cherrybomb and Wilderness.

References

External links
Hazel Webb-Crozier Costume Design

Businesspeople from Belfast
British costume designers
Living people
Year of birth missing (living people)